Sweat Equity is a television show on the DIY Network that shows home owners performing most of the renovations to their house in order to save money and boost the value of their home. The show is hosted by Amy Matthews who is a licensed contractor and personal trainer.

References

External links

Amy Matthews Bio

Home renovation television series
2006 American television series debuts
2010s American television series
DIY Network original programming